Kantharalak is a district (amphoe) in the southeastern part of Sisaket province, northeastern Thailand.

History
The old name of Kantharalak was Mueang Uthumphon Phisai, controlled by Mueang Khukhan. The central office was in Ban Kan Tuat, Tambon Uthumphon Phisai (not to be confused with latter-day Uthumphon Phisai district.) The present district  office is in Tambon Nam Om.

In 1939 the district name was changed from Nam Om to Kantharalak.

Etymology
The name Kantharalak means 'countless ravines', from Pali kandara ('ravine') and the Sanskrit lakṣa (लक्ष), 'a hundred thousand'.

Geography
The district is defined in the south by the Dangrek Range. Neighboring districts are (from the west clockwise): Khun Han, Si Rattana, and Benchalak of Sisaket Province; Thung Si Udom and Nam Khun of Ubon Ratchathani province; Preah Vihear and Oddar Meancheay of Cambodia.

The Khao Phra Wihan National Park office is in the district, while the main attraction of the park, the Khmer ruins of Prasat Preah Vihear, is across the border in Cambodia.

Administration

Central administration 
The district is divided into 20 subdistricts (tambons), which are further subdivided into 279 administrative villages (mubans).

Missing numbers belong to tambon which now form Benchalak district.

Local administration 
There is one town (thesaban mueang) in the district:
 Kantharalak consisting of parts of sub-districts Nam Om and Nong Ya Lat.

There are two sub-district municipalities (thesaban tambon) in the district:
 Nong Ya Lat consisting of parts of sub-district Nong Ya Lat.
 Suan Kluai consisting of sub-district Suan Kluai.

There are 18 subdistrict administrative organizations (SAO) in the district:
 Bueng Malu consisting of sub-district Bueng Malu.
 Kut Salao consisting of sub-district Kut Salao.
 Mueang consisting of  sub-district Mueang.
 Sang Mek consisting of  sub-district Sang Mek.
 Nam Om consisting of parts of sub-district Nam Om.
 Lalai consisting of sub-district Lalai.
 Rung consisting of  sub-district Rung.
 Trakat consisting of  sub-district Trakat.
 Chan Yai consisting of sub-district Chan Yai.
 Phu Ngoen consisting of sub-district Phu Ngoen.
 Cham consisting of sub-district Cham.
 Krachaeng consisting of  sub-district Krachaeng.
 Non Samran consisting of sub-district Non Samran.
 Sao Thong Chai consisting of sub-district Sao Thong Chai.
 Khanun consisting of sub-district Khanun.
 Wiang Nuea consisting of sub-district Wiang Nuea.
 Thung Yai consisting of sub-district Thung Yai.
 Phu Pha Mok consisting of sub-district Phu Pha Mok.

References

External links
amphoe.com (Thai)
Sisaket Database (Thai)

Kantharalak